Henri Antoine Marie Teissier (21 July 1929 – 1 December 2020) was a French-Algerian Catholic Bishop of Algiers and Archbishop Emeritus of Algiers.

Biography
Teissier was born in Lyon and ordained as priest by Diocese of Algiers on 24 May 1955. On 30 November 1972, aged 43, he was appointed by Pope Paul VI Bishop of Oran. He received episcopal consecration on 2 February 1973. On 20 December 1980 he was appointed coadjutor to the archbishop Cardinal Duval in Algiers. In 1988, Cardinal Duval withdrew and Teissier became Archbishop of Algiers.

He had been living in Algeria since 1948 and obtained Algerian citizenship in 1966. Tessier was a member of the Secretariat for relations with non-Christians (1971), as Vice-President of the Arab Caritas International for the country (1975–1987) he was a Muslim-Christian at various symposia and conferences of the two Christians in Palestine involved. Teissier was President of the Conference of Bishops of North Africa from 1982 to 2004. 

He is regarded as one of the authoritative representatives of ecumenism between Christianity and Islam. He remained firm in this position despite 19 murders of non-Muslim religious people which occurred between 1994 and 1996. During this period Pierre Claverie, the Bishop of the Roman Catholic Diocese of Oran, was killed and the assassination of the monks of Tibhirine took place.

Legion of Honor
On 24 May 2008 Pope Benedict XVI accepted his retirement. He was replaced by Father Ghaleb Moussa Abdalla Bader from Latin Patriarchate of Jerusalem. In 2008 he was appointed a knight of the Legion of Honor for his many honorable and peaceful works. Teissier was nominated on 23 September 2009 by Pope Benedict XVI as a member of the Second Special Assembly of the synod for Africa.

Awards
 Knight of the Legion of Honor (July 2007)

Publications
Church in Islam, Éditions du Centurion, 1984
The Mission of the Church, Desclee de Brouwer, 1985
History of Christian North Africa, Desclee de Brouwer, 1991, in collaboration
Letters from Algeria, Bayard-Centurion, 1998
Christians in Algeria, sharing hope, Desclée de Brouwer, 2002

See also

 List of French bishops
 Christianity in Algeria

Sources
 Martine de Sauto, Henri Teissier, a bishop in Algeria, Bayard, 2006 (())

References

External links
Henri Antoine Marie Teissier on Catholic-hierarchy.org(English)
Hommage à notre compatriote Henri Teissier (French)

1929 births
2020 deaths
Clergy from Lyon
People from Algiers
Religion in Algeria
French Roman Catholic bishops in Africa
Chevaliers of the Légion d'honneur
French emigrants to Algeria
French expatriate bishops
Roman Catholic bishops of Oran
Roman Catholic archbishops of Algiers